"Ruby Red" is a song by the British rock band Slade, released in 1982 as the third single from the band's tenth studio album Till Deaf Do Us Part. It was written by lead vocalist Noddy Holder and bassist Jim Lea, and produced by Slade. The single reached No. 51 in the UK.

Background
Following their revival after their performance at the 1980 Reading Festival, Slade signed a deal with RCA Records the following year. In November 1981, the band released the album Till Deaf Do Us Part, which included the UK Top 30 hit "Lock Up Your Daughters". In March 1982, "Ruby Red" would be released as the follow-up single, which reached No. 51 in the UK, remaining on the chart for three weeks.

"Ruby Red" had been written around 1978 but the band's original recording did not meet their expectations. For inclusion on Till Deaf Do Us Part, Holder and Lea further developed the song and the band then recorded it. Speaking of the song in a 1981 interview, Holder revealed: "Recently, when we were looking through the songs that we'd got for the album, we remembered that we'd never been able to get "Ruby Red" down on tape properly, but that it was a good, strong, commercial sound. So we added some new riffs to it and got it down and it's a good commercial song."

Release
"Ruby Red" was released on 7" vinyl by RCA in the UK only. The B-side, "Funk Punk & Junk", was exclusive to the single and would later appear on the band's 2007 compilation B-Sides. The first pressings of the single were released as a double pack edition, containing a free vinyl with two live tracks; "Rock and Roll Preacher" on the A-Side and "Take Me Bak 'Ome" on the B-side.

Music video
A music video was filmed, but was never shown at the time of single's release. It was directed by Eric Boliski. The video featured the band performing on stage, interspersed with other shots showing a lady portraying "Ruby" in the song.
Once again, the music video stayed "hidden" until 2005 when Mark Richards, Steve Knight and David Graham (Slade In England) got their heads and resources together and made sure that fans of the band were able to see the video via the unofficial 'One More Time' documentary DVd created by David Graham.

Critical reception
In a review of Till Deaf Do Us Part, Kerrang! said that the song "puts a size nine boot through the door". In a retrospective review, Geoff Ginsberg of AllMusic described the song as "wonderfully Slade-esque" and a "good album track". In an AllMusic review of the 2007 Salvo compilation The Collection 79-87, Dave Thompson said: "Songs like "Ruby Red" may veer a little closer to generic hard rock than Slade really ought to, but that was the sound of the '80s, just as the glam stomp was what powered their years of omnipotence."

Formats
7" Single
"Ruby Red" – 2:53
"Funk Punk & Junk" – 2:57

7" Single (UK double pack edition)
"Ruby Red" – 2:53
"Funk Punk & Junk" – 2:57
"Rock and Roll Preacher (Live version)" – 5:19		
"Take Me Bak 'Ome (Live version)" – 4:33

Chart performance

Personnel
Noddy Holder - lead vocals, guitar, producer
Dave Hill - lead guitar, backing vocals, producer
Jim Lea - bass, organ, backing vocals, producer
Don Powell - drums, producer

References

1982 singles
Slade songs
RCA Records singles
Songs written by Noddy Holder
Songs written by Jim Lea
1981 songs
Song recordings produced by Jim Lea
Song recordings produced by Noddy Holder
Song recordings produced by Dave Hill
Song recordings produced by Don Powell